Gowji (also Romanized as Gowjī; also known as Gowjīk (Persian: گوجيك), Gorjī, and Gūbī) is a village in Zaveh Rural District, in the Central District of Zaveh County, Razavi Khorasan Province, Iran. At the 2006 census, its population was 211, in 64 families.

References 

Populated places in Zaveh County